is a Japanese professional shogi player, ranked 8-dan and former Ryūō title holder.

Itodani, together with Akira Inaba, Masayuki Toyoshima and Akihiro Murata, is one of four Kansai-based young shogi professionals who are collectively referred to as the "Young Kansai Big Four" (関西若手四天王 Kansai Wakate Shitennō).

Early life and education
Itodani was born in Hiroshima, Japan on October 5, 1988. He learned how to play shogi when he was five years old and he won the 1st and 2nd Elementary School Ōshō tournaments for grades 1 to 3 in 1995 and 1996 as an elementary school student. He entered the Japan Shogi Association's apprentice school in October 1998 at the rank of 6-kyū as a protegee of shogi professional . He was promoted to 1-dan in February 2003 and to 3-dan in 2004.

From October 2004 to March 2005, he participated in the 36th 3-dan League finishing in fourth place with a record of 13 wins and 5 losses. The following season in the 37th 3-dan League (April 2005September 2005), he finished in third place with a record of 12 wins and 6 losses and earned one "promotion point" towards professional status. He obtained professional status and the rank of 4-dan in April 2006 after winning the 38th 3-dan League (October 2005March 2006) with a record of 14 wins and 4 losses.

Itodani continued to attend private junior and senior high schools in Hiroshima prefecture while attempting to become shogi professional. A year after turning professional, Itodani was accepted into Osaka University in 2007 majoring in philosophy. He moved from Hiroshima to Minoh, Osaka and continued to pursue his education as an active shogi professional. After completing his undergraduate studies in 2011, Itodani enrolled in the university's graduate school to continue his study of philosophy, particularly his research of the German philosopher Martin Heidegger. He received his Master of Arts in March 2017 to become the first major-title winner to receive an advanced academic degree.

Promotion history 
The promotion history of Itodani is as follows:
 6-kyū: 1998
 4-dan: April 1, 2006
 5-dan: May 1, 2008
 6-dan: January 12, 2012
 7-dan: September 8, 2014
 8-dan: December 4, 2014

Titles and other championships
Itodani has appeared in major title matches four times. He defeated Toshiyuki Moriuchi in 2014 to win the 27th Ryūō title for his only major title victory. Itodani actually started the 37th Shinjin-Ō tournament while still an apprentice professional 3-dan, but was promoted to professional 4-dan during the tournament.

Awards and honors
Itodani was awarded the Japan Shogi Association Annual Shogi Awards for "Best New Player" and "Most Consecutive Games Won" in 2006 and "Excellent Player" in 2014.

Year-end prize money and game fee ranking
Itodani has finished in the "Top 10" of the JSA's  three times since turning professional: second in 2015 with JPY 55,310,000 in earnings, fourth in 2016 with JPY 35,430,000 in earnings and eighth in 2021 with JPY 18,760,000 in earnings.

References

External links
 ShogiHub: Professional Player Info · Itodani, Tetsuro
 Shogi Fan: Habu defended Ouza title

1988 births
Japanese shogi players
Living people
Professional shogi players
Osaka University alumni
Professional shogi players from Hiroshima Prefecture
People from Hiroshima
Ryūō
Shinjin-Ō